BlazeRush is a top-down vehicular combat video game, developed by the Russian studio Targem Games. The game was released on PlayStation 3 and PC Steam via in October 2014. November 19, 2014 saw the release of the first update 1.0.1. for PC users. On February 19, 2019 the game was released for the Nintendo Switch.

Gameplay 
BlazeRush is an arcade racing game where players compete with each other on various thematic tracks. The main goal of the race is to cross the finish line first. During the race, players can pick up various weapons with different characteristics. Weapons can be used both for attack and defense. You can also find a number of boosters, such as nitro, rocket and pulse variations on the road.
Unlike most traditional races, BlazeRush puts emphasis on split-screen local multiplayer, allowing 4 players at once, as well as the possibility to drop into the game at any time.

Game modes 
The game has three game modes — Survival, King of the Hill and Race.
Survival
In this mode, the pilot with the least numbers of ‘death’ wins. You are also pursued by an angry boss, so those falling behind risk being overwhelmed.
King of the Hill
In the mode ‘King of the Hill’ the pilot to lead for most of the race wins.
Race
A three-lap sprint. The winner is the first person to cross the finish line. Given the level of insanity in the game, the results of each race are often spontaneous and unpredictable.

Story 
The game has three planets suitable for life, and thus for the crazy races. As the game progresses, these planets undergo global changes, serving as a backdrop to our magnificent competition.

References

External links 
 
 BlazeRush at Targem Games

2014 video games
Linux games
Multiplayer and single-player video games
MacOS games
PlayStation 3 games
PlayStation 4 games
Nintendo Switch games
Racing video games
Vehicular combat games
Video games developed in Russia
Video games set on fictional planets
Windows games
Targem Games games